Vilna Governorate-General, known as Lithuania Governorate-General before 1830, was a Governorate-General of the Russian Empire from 1794 to 1912. It primarily encompassed the Vilna, Grodno, and Kovno Governorates. Governors General were also commanders of the Vilna Military District. According to the Russian Empire Census, the Governorate-General had 4,754,000 residents in 1897.

Composition
The Governorate-General was established in November 1794 when territories of the Grand Duchy of Lithuania were incorporated into the Russian Empire following the Third Partition of the Polish–Lithuanian Commonwealth. The core of the Governorate-General was the present-day territory of Lithuania and western Belarus. In 1794–1797, the Governorate-General was composed of two governorates, Vilna Governorate and Slonim Governorate, which were merged into the Lithuania Governorate by Paul I of Russia. After his assassination, the governorate was again divided into Vilna and Grodno Governorates. In 1834, Kovno Governorate was formed from the seven western powiats of the Vilna Governorate.

The Governorate-General temporarily included other territories as well:
 Minsk Governorate (1834–1852, 1862–1870)
 Vitebsk Governorate (1862–1869)
 Mogilev Governorate (1862–1869)
 Four uyezds of Augustów Governorate (1863–1864)

Governors General

References

 
1794 establishments in the Russian Empire
States and territories established in 1794
1912 disestablishments in the Russian Empire
States and territories disestablished in 1912
Governorates-General of the Russian Empire
History of Vilnius